Kaïn is a folk rock group from Drummondville, Quebec, Canada. The group of four is made up of Steve Veilleux (vocals, electric and acoustic guitar), Yanick Blanchette (drums and vocals), Patrick Lemieux (electric and acoustic guitar, banjo, harmonica and vocals) and Éric Maheu (bass guitar). Their style is a blend of rock and roll with Quebec folk music.

History
The group formed in 1999. The founding members were Veilleux, Planchette, Lemieux and guitarist Pascal Tessier. They first signed a contract with Les Disques Passeport in 2003. They released their first album, Pop Culture, in 2004 from the recording company Les Disques Passeport, a small company in Montreal, Quebec.

The band's second album, Nulle part ailleurs, was released in 2005. Tessier left the band at about this time and bassist Éric Maheu joined. The album spent over 100 weeks in the top twenty in the francophone top 100 chart.

After the band's fourth album, Le Vrai Monde, was released in 2011, the band went on a tour of festivals and theatres.

Members
Veilleux, whose father played the accordion and the violin, himself started playing guitar and writing music at a young age. Blanchette also came from a family of musicians; he had in 1990 co-founded the metal music band Subversion. Lemieux studied blues and rock music at Cégep in Drummondville.  Maheu, formerly of the band La Chicane, started with a solo career, and recorded commercials for Burger King.

Discography

Studio albums
2004: Pop Culture
2005: Nulle part ailleurs
2007: Les saisons s'tassent No. 3 CAN
2011: Le vrai monde No. 7 CAN
2013: Pleurer pour rire No. 15 CAN
2017: Welcome bonheur No. 22 CAN
2019: Je viens d'ici - 20 years anniversary album - Label; Disques Musicor - Released; Octobre 4, 2019

DVDs
2006: On Dormira Demain

Singles
2003: "Parle-moi d'toi"
2004: "Comme une étoile"
2004: "Autour de l'ombre"
2005: "Embarque ma belle"
2006: "Adam et Ève"
2006: "Comme dans le temps"
2006: "Mexico"
2007: "L'amour du jour"
2008: "On dormira demain"
2008: "La maison est grande"

Other contributions
2008: Groupes de Pamplemousse - "Comme un cave"

Awards
Best group at the 2006 ADISQ awards.
Received two SOCAN awards in 2006 for the songs "Mexico" and "Comme dans le Temps" in the category of most played.

References

External links
 Kaïn Official site (French)
 Kaïn at Myspace (French)

Musical groups established in 2003
Musical groups from Quebec
Canadian folk rock groups